The Journal of Qur'anic Studies is a peer-reviewed academic journal that focuses on Qur’anic Studies from a wide range of scholarly perspectives, reflecting a diversity of approaches. It publishes articles both in English and Arabic, to encourage the bridging of the gap between the two traditions of Muslim and Western scholarship. The journal principally publishes original papers, along with a book review section including reviews of new works on the Qur’an.

External links 
 
 Journal page at the School of Oriental and African Studies
 Centre of Islamic Studies, School of Oriental and African Studies

Islamic studies journals
Multilingual journals
Edinburgh University Press academic journals
Biannual journals
Publications established in 1999
Works about the Quran